He Lin or Lin He is the name of:

Lin He (biologist) (何琳; born 1974), Chinese-American molecular biologist
He Lin (actress) (何琳; born 1977), Chinese actress
He Lin (贺林; born 1953), Chinese biologist, member of the Chinese Academy of Sciences
He Lin (engineer) (何琳; born 1957), member of the Chinese Academy of Engineering

See also
Helin (disambiguation)
Linhe (disambiguation)